Shahi Sayed or Shahi Syed is a Pakistani politician who has been the Senator   and  the President of Awami National Party Sindh chapter, Pakistan. He is also the chairman of the Pakhtun Action Committee or Pakhtun Loya Jirga of Karachi

Sayed is originally from Babozai Village in the district of Mardan, Khyber Pakhtunkhwa province. Shahi Sayed owned CNG gas stations in Karachi before becoming involved in politics.

Sayed came to Karachi in 1971 to attain education and eventually landed a job at a private company. From there, he started a small transport business and within a decade, he morphed into a well-established businessman.
He joined the ANP on April 15, 2001. Within two years he was elected the president of the party's Sindh chapter. Since then, he has been reelected to the post three times. Last year Syed was elected as an ANP senator.

See also
 Pakhtun Action Committee
 Pakhtun Loya Jirga
 Awami National Party

References

Politics of Karachi
Awami National Party politicians
Living people
Pashtun people
Politicians from Karachi
Pakistani senators (14th Parliament)
Year of birth missing (living people)